The Hodï (Jodï, Jotí, Hoti) language, also known as Yuwana (Yoana), Waruwaru, or Chikano (Chicano), is a small unclassified language spoken by the Hodï people of Venezuela. Very little is known of it; its several hundred speakers are monolingual hunter-gatherers. The people call themselves Jojodö ('the people') or Wįlǫ̈, and their language Jojodö tjįwęnę.

Sources are inconsistent with nasals, varying between e.g. nV and lṼ.

Classification
No classification of Hodï has yet been established to the satisfaction of linguists.

Attempts have been made to link Hodï with the nearby Piaroa–Saliban languages. A recent proposal classifies Hodï and (Piaroa–)Saliban as the branches of a single Jodï–Saliban macrofamily. However, similarities in vocabulary with the Piaroa–Saliban languages may in fact be due to sprachbunding: Henley, Mattéi-Müller and Reid (1996) argue that the apparent cognates between Hodï and Piaroa–Saliban are rather loanwords.

Limited by poor data, Henley et al. argue that Hodï may be related to the Nadahup languages. The only linguist to speak Hodï and Piaroa, Stanford Zent, has collected more reliable data and argues that it is "probably" related to the Piaroa–Saliban languages.

Since 1985 a relationship to the Yanomaman languages has also been suggested, in part on the grounds that Hodï shares 20% of its vocabulary with this family, but this hypothesis has since been largely rejected.

Phonology
The first phonological analysis is Vilera Díaz (1985). She largely retains the vocalic description of earlier researchers, apart from finding vowel length is a product of emphasis, but does not state whether vowel nasalization is phonemic, and does not provide a minimal pair for /o/ vs /u/.

The mid central vowel is written .

Vowels

Quatra (2008) maintains that [ɛ] and [ɑ] are distinct phonemes, but does not provide any minimal pairs to demonstrate that. He also maintains that [ɘ] and [ɑ] are only nasalized following nasal consonants. 

Consonants

There is no minimal pair for /β/, so it is not clear that it's a separate phoneme. 

/n/ is [ŋ] before a velar. /k/ and /kʲ/ are [ɡ, ɡʲ] after a nasal and occasionally intervocalicly. Intervocalic /l/ is [ɺ]. /b/ (perhaps ɓ) is [ɓʷ] before /i e o/. /ɗ/ was written 'd' due to lack of typewriter support. It's not clear why /w/ is placed in the labial rather than the labio-velar column, nor why it isn't paired with /hʷ/. 

[kʲ] varies as [tʃʲ], and [dʒ] varies as [ɲ] in all contexts, not just adjacent to nasal vowels. 

Phonetic aspiration occurs at boundaries, often before voiceless consonants and always before /l/.

The voiced stops are realized as nasals [m n] between nasal vowels. From the orthography, it is assumed that the 'aspirated' consonants are pre-aspirated, but there are no minimal pairs to establish them as phonemic.

Bibliography
Guarisma P., V.; Coppens, W. (1978). Vocabulario Hoti. Antropológica, 49:3-27. GUDSCHINSKY, S. C. (1974). Fragmentos de Ofaié: a descrição de uma língua extinta. Série Lingüística, 3:177-249. Brasília: SIL.
Krisólogo B., P. J. (1976). Manual glotológico del idioma wo'tiheh. (Lenguas indígenas de Venezuela, 16.) Caracas: Centro de lenguas Indigenas, Instituto de Investigaciones Historicas, Universidad Católica "Andrés Bello".
Mattei-Müller, M. (1981). Vocabulario Hodï (Hoti). (Manuscript).
Quatra, M. M. (2008). Bajkewa jkwïkïdëwa-jya jodï ine - Dodo ine. Diccionario básico Castellano - Jodï. Caracas: Ediciones IVIC.

References

External links
 Alain Fabre 2005. Diccionario etnolingüístico y guía bibliográfica de los pueblos indígenas sudamericanos: HOTI
 Yuwana (Intercontinental Dictionary Series)

Indigenous languages of the Americas
Jodi–Saliban languages